Viterbe may refer to:

 Viterbo, a comune (township) in the Lazio region of central Italy,
 Viterbe, a commune of the Tarn département, in France